San Miguel de El Faique District is one of eight districts of the province Huancabamba in Peru.

References